Cataract is the second studio album by American alternative country band The Walkabouts released on March 1, 1989 through Sub Pop Records.

Track listing
All tracks written by The Walkabouts.

 "Whiskey xxx" – 2:56
 "Hell's Soup Kitchen" – 3:24
 "Whereabouts Unknown" – 3:01
 "End-In-Tow" – 3:23
 "Bones of Contention" – 4:38
 "Home as Found" – 2:38
 "Smokestack" – 3:04
 "The Wicked Skipper" – 1:38
 "Drille Terriers" – 2:24
 "Specimen Days" – 3:44
 "Long Black Veil" – 5:01
 "Goodbye (to all That)" – 3:05

Release history

Personnel 

 Michael Wells – bass, harmonica
 Carla Torgerson – vocals, guitar, keyboard, cello, percussion
 Grant Eckman – drums, percussion
 Chris Eckman – vocals, guitars, mountain dulcimer, tapes

 Additional musicians

 Jonathan Siegel – violin on "Whereabouts Unknown"
 Terry Lee Hale – slide guitar on "Home as Found"
 Carl Miller – trombone on "Smokestack"
 Liv Torgerson – backup vocals on "Drille Terriers"

 Technical personnel

 Ed Brooks – production, engineering
 Tony Kroes – production, engineering
 The Walkabouts – production

 Additional personnel

 William Forsythe – cover photo "Eddy and Dashdown", September 23, 1933
 Ben Thompson – cover design

Critical reception

Harold DeMuir wrote for "Trouser Press Record Guide, 4th Ed." that "The full-length 'Cataract' resonates with rueful Americana on such tracks as 'Whiskey XXX', "Hell's Soup Kitchen" and 'Long Black Veil' (not the traditional song), marking The Walkabouts as a distinctive band with loads of potential.".

In The Walkabouts entry of "The Trouser Press Guide to 90's Rock: The All-New Fifth Edition of The Trouser Press Record Guide" Scott Schinder wrote 
"Cataract and the six-song Rag & Bone (combined as Rag & Bone Plus Cataract, a single CD bearing the EP's original artwork) are more distinctive, mining a richly shadowy strain of Americana.".

In a review for the Backlash magazine Ransom Edison wrote "... Compared to The Walkabouts' debut album, last year's 'See Beautiful Rattlesnake Gardens,' 'Cataract' is a more refined and consistent effort, pushing the folk influence even further yet exploring a greater variety of musical approaches. ...".

References

1989 albums
The Walkabouts albums